Christ Episcopal School is a private, co-educational college preparatory school in Covington, Louisiana, north of New Orleans.  Christ Episcopal School is affiliated with Christ Episcopal Church.

History 
Christ Episcopal School was founded in 1984. The first high school class graduated in 2013.

Academics 
Christ Episcopal teaches students in grades early pre-kindergarten through 12th grade, and is organized into the Early Childhood Campus, Lower School, Junior High, and High School.  

The school is a member of the Independent Schools Association of the Southwest.

Athletics 
Christ Episcopal won its first state title in 2017 as the girls Cross Country LHSAA Class C champion.

In 2018, the Christ Episcopal girls basketball team won the division V state championship in its first year of LHSAA competition.  Later in 2018, the Christ Episcopal girls track and field team won the LHSAA Class C state championship.

In the Fall of 2018, Christ Episcopal won its first state title in a boys sport when it became the LHSAA Class C Cross Country champion.  At the same meet Christ Episcopal successfully defended its girls Cross County LHSAA Class C state championship.

In May 2019 Christ Episcopal defended its LHSAA Class C state championship in girls Track & Field.

Student life

Outdoor education 
The wilderness education has a week-long trip to Yosemite National Park in high school.

Fine arts 
- In February 2019 Christ Episcopal produced Mary Poppins

- Christ Episcopal staged an original adaptation of Mary Shelley's Frankenstein in 2017.

- In October 2018, the Theater department staged an adaptation of "The Crucible" by Arthur Miller

- In November 2019, the Theater department staged an adaptation of "Sense and Sensibility" by Jane Austen

Clubs and organizations 
- Speech and Debate

- Quiz Bowl

Campus facilities 

 Reily Academic & Athletic Complex, Dathel Fine Arts Center
 William A. Copeland III Memorial Tennis Center

References

External links 
 Christ Episcopal School official website
 Satellite photo of Christwood Boulevard campus
 Report from GreatSchools.org
 Report from Niche.com

 

Preparatory schools in Louisiana
Episcopal schools in the United States
Episcopal Church in Louisiana
Private high schools in Louisiana
Private middle schools in Louisiana
Private elementary schools in Louisiana
Independent Schools Association of the Southwest
Schools in St. Tammany Parish, Louisiana
Educational institutions established in 1984
Covington, Louisiana
1984 establishments in Louisiana